Jornal da Globo (Globo Journal) is the late night news show broadcast by the Brazilian television channel TV Globo. It doesn't have a fixed starting time, but usually airs at or after midnight, Monday to Friday evenings.

Hosted by Renata Lo Prete it shows a detailed summary of the news of the day, highlighting matters such as Brazilian and world's economics and politics. It's eventually hosted by Carlos Tramontina, Rodrigo Bocardi, César Tralli and Roberto Kovalick.

Jornal da Globo was originally launched in 1967 as replacement for Tele Globo as TV Globo's first newscast, hosted by Hilton Gomes and Luiz Jatobá. Its first incarnation ended in March 1969 just months before the launch of Jornal Nacional. Jornal da Globo was relaunched for a second time in 1979 and hosted by Sérgio Chapelin, ending again in 1981, replaced by a second edition of Jornal Nacional before being relaunched for a third time in its current incarnation in 1982.

Presenter 
 Renata Lo Prete
Relief presenter 

 Commentators
 Carlos Alberto Sardenberg - economy
 Caio Ribeiro - sports
 Arnaldo Jabor - general issues
 Nelson Motta - culture

Ex-holders 
 Hilton Gomes (1967 - 1969)
 Luiz Jatobá (1967 - 1969)
 Sérgio Chapelin (1979 - 1981)
 Renato Machado (1982 - 1983)
 Belisa Ribeiro (1982 - 1983)
 Luciana Villas Boas (1982 - 1983)
 Leilane Neubarth (1983 - 1986)
 Eliakim Araújo (1983 - 1989)
 Leila Cordeiro (1986 - 1989)
 William Bonner (1989 - 1992)
 Fátima Bernardes (1989 - 1992)
 Lilian Witte Fibe (1993 - 1996/1998 - 2000)
 Monica Waldvogel (1996 - 1997)
 Sandra Annenberg (1997 - 1998)
 Carlos Tramontina (2000)
 Ana Paula Padrão (2000 - 2005)
 Chico Pinheiro (2005)
 Cristiane Pelajo (2005 - 2015)
 William Waack (2005 - 2017)

Former relief presenters
 Celso Freitas (1982-1990)
 Leda Nagle (1982-1989)
 Eliakim Araújo (1982-1983)
 Marcus Hummel (1985-1993)
 Augusto Xavier (1986-1994)
 Fátima Bernardes (1987-1989)
 Lilian Witte Fibe (1988-1993)
 William Bonner (1988-1989)
 Monica Waldvogel (1992-1996 and 1999)
 Cristina Ranzolin (1993)
 Sandra Annenberg (1993-1997)
 Mona Dorf (1998-1999) 
 Carlos Tramontina (1997-2000/2017-2020)
 Chico Pinheiro (2000-2005)
 William Waack (2000-2005)
 Carlos Alberto Sardenberg (2012-2014)
 Poliana Abritta (2012-2014)
 Zileide Silva (2014)
 Renata Lo Prete (2015-2017)
 Márcio Gomes (2019-2020)
 Roberto Kovalick (2020)

See also 
 TV Globo

References

External links 
Official Site

1967 Brazilian television series debuts
Rede Globo original programming
Brazilian television news shows
Portuguese-language television shows
Flagship evening news shows